The Renard Type 100 was a five-cylinder, radial piston engine, designed and produced in the late 1920s and early 1930s by Société Anonyme des Avions et Moteurs Renard (Renard) in Belgium.

Design and development
The Type 100 was a conventional air-cooled radial engine with overhead valves, operated by push-rods and rockers. Accessories were mounted on the rear crankcase plate and the propeller was driven directly, with no reduction gearing.

Specifications (Type 100)

References

1920s aircraft piston engines